Benjamin Franklin "Ben" Funk (December 6, 1902 – November 24, 1969) was an American boxer who competed in the 1924 Summer Olympics. In 1924, Funk was eliminated in the second round of the middleweight class after losing his fight to the eventual bronze medalist Joseph Beecken.

Funk was born and died Bloomington, Illinois, and was a 1925 graduate of Yale University.

References

Further reading

External links
Ben Funk boxing profile

1902 births
1969 deaths
Boxers from Illinois
Middleweight boxers
Olympic boxers of the United States
Boxers at the 1924 Summer Olympics
Sportspeople from Bloomington, Illinois
American male boxers
Yale University alumni